The Progressive Alliance is a social-democratic political party of Uruguay founded in 1999 by the former Vice President Rodolfo Nin Novoa, and since its foundation, it is part of the Frente Amplio.

In August 2009 the Progressive Alliance, Uruguay Assembly led by the then Vice President Danilo Astori and the New Space led by Senator Rafael Michelini joined forces to create the Liber Seregni Front, a political moderate sector within the Frente Amplio. The Christian Democratic Party is part of the Progressive Alliance.

In the last election the Progressive Alliance won one seat in the Chamber of Senators and other in the Chamber of Deputies taken by Pablo Pérez for Maldonado Department.

Members 
Its prominent members are current Senator Rodolfo Nin Novoa, former Minister of Tourism and Sport Héctor Lescano, former deputy Liliam Kechichian and Jorge Rodriguez.

Electoral history

Presidential elections 
Due to its membership in the Broad Front, the party has endorsed the candidates of other parties on several occasions. Presidential elections in Uruguay are held using a two-round system, the results of which are displayed below.

See also
Frente Amplio
Uruguay Assembly
New Space
List of vice presidents of Uruguay

References

1999 establishments in Uruguay
Broad Front (Uruguay)
Political parties established in 1999
Political parties in Uruguay
Political party factions in Uruguay
Social democratic parties in Uruguay